Shehu may refer to:

 Arben Shehu (born 1967), Albanian footballer
 Bashkim Shehu (born 1955), Albanian writer
 Mehmet Shehu (1913–1981), Albanian communist politician
 Ylli Shehu (born 1966), Albanian footballer
 The title of a ruler of the Borno Emirate, Nigeria
 The title of a ruler of the Dikwa Emirate, Nigeria
 Shehu Shagari, 6th President of Nigeria (1925–2018)
 Shehu Musa Yar'Adua, 4th De facto vice president of Nigeria, (1943–1997)

See also
 Sheikh

Albanian-language surnames